Suiyang may refer to the following locations in China:

 Suiyang District (睢阳区), Shangqiu, Henan
 Suiyang County (绥阳县), of Zunyi, Guizhou
 Suiyang, Fenggang County (绥阳镇), town in Guizhou
 Suiyang, Dongning County (绥阳镇), town in Heilongjiang
 Suiyang (睢阳), historical name of Shangqiu, Henan